Umbarger is an unincorporated community and census-designated place in Randall County, Texas, United States. According to the Handbook of Texas, the community had an estimated population of 327 in 2000. The community is part of the Amarillo, Texas Metropolitan Statistical Area.

Geography
Umbarger is located at  (34.9545022, -96.2510895). The community is situated along U.S. Highway 60 in west central Randall County, approximately 10 miles southwest of Canyon and 26 miles southwest of Amarillo.

Climate
According to the Köppen Climate Classification system, Umbarger has a semi-arid climate, abbreviated "BSk" on climate maps.

History
The origins of the community date back to the mid-1890s. In 1895, rancher S.G. Umbarger leased the site from the Houston and Great Northern Railroad survey lands. He purchased it two years later and established several businesses that catered to area settlers and travelers. The Panhandle and Santa Fe Railway established a switch near Umbarger's ranch in 1898. Although Umbarger sold his ranch and moved to nearby Canyon in 1900, the settlement retained its name.

As more land was made available to homesteaders, the community slowly began to grow. In 1902, a group of German Catholics from the Schulenburg area in south central Texas settled in Umbarger. The migration was pioneered by Pius Friemel. A general store that housed a post office opened soon after, followed by the creation of a public school district in 1904. Around the same time a Catholic missionary, Father Joseph Reisdorff, worked to attract other German families to the community. In 1908, both he and John Hutson, an Englishman who had speculated in land holdings around Umbarger, filed separate plans of settlement. The subsequent friction led to the building of two separate Catholic churches. Swiss immigrants settled in Umbarger from 1911 to the late 1920s. By that time, the business district was centered in Reisdorff's portion of Umbarger on the north side of the railroad tracks. Under the leadership of Father John J. Dolje, St. Mary's Church was moved to its present-day location.

Eighty people lived in Umbarger in 1930. The population grew to 150 by 1940. Umbarger's public school district consolidated with Canyon's in 1964. Its location near Amarillo and Canyon as well as its proximity to Buffalo Lake have contributed to the survival and growth of the community. Although it remains unincorporated, Umbarger is home to over 300 residents, several businesses, and a functioning post office (zip code: 79091).

Attractions

Each November, Umbarger hosts an annual German Sausage Festival at St. Mary's Parish Hall. St. Mary's Church features painted murals, wood carvings, and stained glass windows which were created by several Italian prisoners of war who were interned at the nearby Hereford Military Reservation and Reception Center during World War II. Dino Gambetti, one of the prisoners who created pieces for the church, would go on to have a career as an artist in Italy; although he is probably more well known for encouraging fellow prisoner Alberto Burri to become an artist. The community is located three miles north of Buffalo Lake and the Buffalo Lake National Wildlife Refuge.

Education
Public education in the community of Umbarger is provided by the Canyon Independent School District. Students are zoned to Crestview Elementary School (grades K-4), Canyon Intermediate School (grades 5-6), Canyon Junior High School (grades 7-8), and Canyon High School (grades 9-12).

References

External links

Census-designated places in Texas
Census-designated places in Randall County, Texas
Unincorporated communities in Texas
Unincorporated communities in Randall County, Texas
Unincorporated communities in Amarillo metropolitan area